Knyaginino is a rural locality (a village) in Podlesnoye Rural Settlement, Vologodsky District, Vologda Oblast, Russia. The population was 340 as of 2002.

Geography 
Knyaginino is located 19 km southeast of Vologda (the district's administrative centre) by road. Koptsevo is the nearest rural locality.

References 

Rural localities in Vologodsky District